Neal D. Barnard, born 10 July 1953 in Fargo, North Dakota, is an American author, clinical researcher, and founding president of the Physicians Committee for Responsible Medicine (PCRM).

Early life and education
Barnard grew up in Fargo, North Dakota. He received his medical training at George Washington University School of Medicine in psychiatry, where he began to explore vegan diets. He is board certified by the American Board of Psychiatry and Neurology, a fellow of the American College of Cardiology and a lifetime member of the American Medical Association.

Career
Barnard founded Physicians Committee for Responsible Medicine (PCRM) in 1985 to promote preventive medicine. By 2016, the Washington D.C.-based PCRM had 150,000 members, including 12,000 physicians and reported revenues of more than $20 million. He appeared in the documentaries Forks Over Knives (2011) and What the Health (2017). 

Barnard serves as an Adjunct Associate Professor of Medicine at the George Washington University School of Medicine. He founded the Barnard Medical Center in 2015 as part of PCRM, and it opened in 2016 with him as president; the center provides primary care and emphasizes diet and preventive medicine.

Barnard is a non-practicing psychiatrist. He plays cello, guitar, and keyboards, and has been a member of the bands Pop Maru, Verdun, and Carbonworks.

In 2011, Barnard was inducted into the Vegetarian Hall of Fame of the North American Vegetarian Society during its summer conference, where he has occasionally spoken.

Awards
Lifestyle Medicine Trailblazer Award, 2016 from The American College of Lifestyle Medicine (ACLM)
6th Plantrician Project Luminary Award, 2019 - from The Plantrician Project

Published work

Journal publications
Barnard ND, Willett WC, Ding EL. "The misuse of meta-analysis in nutrition research." JAMA. 2017; 318(15):1435-1436.. 
Barnard ND, Katz DL. "Building on the Supplemental Nutrition Assistance Program’s Success: Conquering Hunger, Improving Health." Am J Prev Med. 2017;52(2S2):S103-S105.
Barnard ND, Levin SM, Yokoyama Y. "A systematic review and meta-analysis of changes in body weight in clinical trials of vegetarian diets." J Acad Nutr Diet. 2015 Jun;115(6):954-69.]
Barnard ND, Bush AI, Ceccarelli A, de Jager CA, Erickson KI, Fraser G, Kesler S, Levin SM, Lucey B, Morris MC, Squitti R. "Dietary and lifestyle guidelines for the prevention of Alzheimer’s disease." [https://www.ncbi.nlm.nih.gov/pubmed/24913896 Neurobiol Aging. 2014;35 Suppl 2:S74-8.
Barnard ND, Cohen J, Jenkins DJ, Turner-McGrievy G, Gloede L, Green A, Ferdowsian H. "A low-fat vegan diet and a conventional diabetes diet in the treatment of type 2 diabetes: a randomized, controlled, 74-week clinical trial." Am J Clin Nutr 2009;89(suppl):1588S-96S. 
Barnard ND, Cohen J, Jenkins DJ, Turner-McGrievy G, Gloede L, Jaster B, Seidl K, Green AA, Talpers S. "A low-fat, vegan diet improves glycemic control and cardiovascular risk factors in a randomized clinical trial in individuals with type 2 diabetes." Diabetes Care 2006;29:1777-1783.

Books
Barnard ND. The Power of Your Plate (1990: Book Publishing Co., Summertown, TN) 
Barnard ND. A Physician's Slimming Guide (1992: Book Publishing Co., Summertown, TN) 
Barnard ND. Food for Life (1993: Harmony/Random House, New York, NY) 
Barnard ND. Eat Right, Live Longer (1995: Harmony/Random House, New York, NY) 
Barnard ND. Foods that Cause You to Lose Weight (1992: The Magni Group, McKinney, TX)  Barnard ND. Foods that Cause You to Lose Weight II (1996: The Magni Group, McKinney, TX) 
Barnard ND (ed.) The Best in the World, volume I (1998), volume II (2000), volume III (2010), and volume IV (2014), (Physicians Committee for Responsible Medicine, Washington, DC). 
Barnard ND. Foods That Fight Pain (1998: Harmony/Random House, New York, NY) 
Barnard ND. Turn off the Fat Genes (2001: Harmony/Random House, New York, NY) 
Barnard ND. Breaking the Food Seduction (2003: St. Martin’s Press, New York, NY) 
Barnard ND. Dr. Neal Barnard's Program for Reversing Diabetes. (2007, revised edition 2018: Rodale, Emmaus, PA) 
Barnard ND, Weissinger R, Jaster BJ, Kahan S, Smyth C. A Nutrition Guide for Clinicians. 1st edition 2007 ; 2nd edition 2009 ; 3rd edition 2018 (Physicians Committee for Responsible Medicine, Washington, DC) 
Barnard ND and Reilly J. The Cancer Survivor's Guide (2008: Healthy Living Publications, Summertown, TN) 
Barnard ND and Webb R. The Get Healthy, Go Vegan Cookbook (2010: Da Capo, New York). 
Barnard ND. 21-Day Weight-Loss Kickstart (2011: Grand Central, New York). 
Barnard ND. Power Foods for the Brain (2013: Grand Central, New York). 
Barnard ND. The Cheese Trap (2017: Grand Central, New York).  
Barnard ND. Dr. Neal Barnard's Cookbook for Reversing Diabetes (2018: Rodale, Emmaus, PA).
Barnard ND and Nixon LS. Your Body in Balance: the New Science of Food, Hormones, and Health (2020: Grand Central, New York).

See also
 List of animal rights advocates
 List of vegans

References

External links

 
 

1953 births
Living people
20th-century American physicians
21st-century American physicians
American health and wellness writers
American nutritionists
American psychiatrists
American veganism activists
Anti-vivisectionists
Fellows of the American College of Cardiology
George Washington University School of Medicine & Health Sciences alumni
Plant-based diet advocates
Physicians from North Dakota
Vegan cookbook writers
Writers from Fargo, North Dakota
George Washington University School of Medicine & Health Sciences faculty